Acrocercops iraniana is a moth of the family Gracillariidae, known from Iran. It was described by P. Tiberti in 1990.

References

iraniana
Moths of the Middle East
Moths described in 1990